Morris Hicky Morgan (February 8, 1859 in Providence, Rhode Island–1910) was professor of classical philology at Harvard University.

After graduating from Harvard College, Morgan was immediately after his graduation appointed to the teaching staff. After the death of Frederic D. Allen in 1899 he succeeded to the chair of classical philology. He was praised by his fellow classicists as an interpreter of Vitruvius. His translation of Vitruvius's The Ten Books of Architecture, based on an older translation by Valentine Rose (second edition, Leipzig, 1899), remains in print today, though he died before completing it, the final parts being translated by Albert A. Howard. In a note to a 2009 English edition, translator Richard Schofield writes that Morgan's translation "is certainly the best in English and deserves its longevity... and I doubt if his dignified and intelligent prose could be surpassed, even though here and there it is faintly dated."

In 1896 he was appointed Harvard University Marshall.

Morgan fell seriously ill on March 15, 1910 while on a trip to New York, and died soon after.

Notes

References
Prof. M.H. Morgan Critically Ill, in The New York Times (March 16, 1910), p. 9.
, Morris Hicky Morgan: 1859-1910, in Classical Philology 5 (1910), p. 357.
, A Short History of Classical Scholarship from the Sixth Century BC to the Present Day, Cambridge, 1915, p. 425.

External links
 
 
 
 

American classical scholars
Classical scholars of Harvard University
1859 births
1910 deaths
Scholars of ancient Greek literature
Classical philologists
Harvard College alumni